Yakov Nikolayevich Rylov (born January 15, 1985) is a Russian professional ice hockey defender. He is currently under contract with Amur Khabarovsk of the Kontinental Hockey League (KHL).

Playing career
Rylov joined Metallurg Magnitogorsk, after a second stint with original club HC Dynamo Moscow, as a free agent prior to the 2018–19 season, on 15 July 2018. He appeared in every game on the blueline with Metallurg, posting 2 goals and 5 points in 60 appearances.

On 14 June 2019, Rylov opted to sign as a free agent with his 6th KHL club, HC Spartak Moscow, on a one-year contract.

Career statistics

International

Honours
Russian championship:  2005
IIHF European Champions Cup:  2006

References

External links

1985 births
Living people
Russian ice hockey defencemen
Ak Bars Kazan players
Amur Khabarovsk players
Avtomobilist Yekaterinburg players
HC CSKA Moscow players
HC Dynamo Moscow players
Metallurg Magnitogorsk players
HC Neftekhimik Nizhnekamsk players
HC Spartak Moscow players